Cola boxiana is a species of medium tree in the Family Malvaceae.  It is endemic to the lowland Eastern Guinean forests, or tropical rainforests, of Ghana.  As with many tree species growing in these coastal rainforests, it is threatened by habitat loss.

References

boxiana
Endemic flora of Ghana
Trees of Africa
Endangered flora of Africa
Taxonomy articles created by Polbot
Taxa named by Ronald William John Keay